Francis Thomé (18 October 1850 – 16 November 1909), was a French pianist and composer.

He was born in Port Louis, Mauritius, and studied at the Paris Conservatoire with Jules Duprato and Ambroise Thomas. After leaving the Conservatoire, he became well known as a composer of salon pieces and was in demand as a pianist and teacher. His music was particularly successful in the French provinces, and two of his operas were first performed outside Paris. He became popular towards the end of the 19th century as a composer of accompanied poems, but is also known for his stage works, which encompassed various genres, including ballet, pantomime, incidental music (for a wide range of plays), bluettes, and operettas, such as Le Baron Frick (1885), the latter collaboration with Ernest Guiraud, Georges Pfeiffer, and Victorin de Joncières.

References

Sources
 Article by David Charlton in the New Grove Dictionary of Opera, edited by Stanley Sadie (London, 1992).  and

External links
 
 

1850 births
1909 deaths
19th-century classical composers
19th-century French composers
19th-century French male musicians
Conservatoire de Paris alumni
French classical composers
French male classical composers
French opera composers
Male opera composers
Mauritian emigrants to France
People from Port Louis District
Pupils of Antoine François Marmontel